Electrolux Laundry Systems, previously named Electrolux-Wascator, is a supplier of laundry equipment including washer extractors, dryers and finishing equipment. The company is a part of Electrolux Professional.

History
The company Värmelednings AB Calor was founded in Stockholm in 1902. Calor’s primary business interest was the installation of heating systems, but they also produced large, belt-driven washing machines.

The company’s previous brand Wascator (a combination of the words washing and lavatory) was given to a small front-loading washing machine intended for household use at the end of the 1940s. A few years after the success of the first small Wascator washing machine, the entire company adopted the name Wascator. In 1973 the company was acquired by Electrolux and Electrolux- Wascator was formed. The company provides laundry equipment for applications including homes, apartment houses, hotels, health care institutions, industrial laundry operations and coin-operated launderettes.

In the 1990s, Wascator sold rebranded Asko ASEA front loading washing machines and driers under their name. Asko built Wascators have a yellow/black color scheme and a drain valve instead of a drain pump, in comparison to domestic Askos who have a pump and are colored in white or stainless.

The company has approximately 1,108 employees at three manufacturing plants in France, Sweden and Thailand and sales companies in 19 countries, via a network of 120 importers.

Product range
The company supplies commercial laundry equipment including washer extractors, barrier and side load washers, tumble dryers, ironers, finishing equipment, standard reference washing machine and wet-cleaning equipment. Their products are RoHS-compliant and over 95% recyclable. Their factories are ISO 14001-certified.

Wascomat
 In the United States, their products are marketed under the brands Electrolux and Wascomat, by  Laundrylux., which has the rights to market and sell the Wascomat and Electrolux brands throughout North America. The largest customers are coin-operated laundries, multi-family laundries, and on-premises laundries.

References

External links
Electrolux Laundry Systems - Official international site
Electrolux Laundry Systems - Official USA site
Electrolux Laundry Systems - Official Swedish site
Electrolux Professional Systems - Official Macedonian site
Wascomat - Wascomat
Laundrylux 
 Electrolux Professional Laundry launches Revolutionary Cleaning Concept: Inside Hospitals UK
Electrolux Laundry Systems  - Official Swedish site

Electrolux brands